Lambros Lambrou may refer to
Lambros Lambrou (footballer) (born 1977), Cypriot association football defender
Lambros Lambrou (skier) (born 1957), Cypriot Olympic alpine skier